Masbate's 1st congressional district is one of the three congressional districts of the Philippines in the province of Masbate. It has been represented in the House of Representatives since 1987. The district consists of six municipalities in the Burias and Ticao islands of northern Masbate, namely Claveria and San Pascual in Burias island, and Batuan, Monreal, San Fernando and San Jacinto in Ticao island. It is currently represented in the 19th Congress by Richard Kho of the PDP-Laban.

Representation history

Election results

2019

2016

2013

2010

See also
Legislative districts of Masbate

References

Congressional districts of the Philippines
Politics of Masbate
1987 establishments in the Philippines
Congressional districts of the Bicol Region
Constituencies established in 1987